Copra itch is a skin condition that occurs on persons handling copra who are subject to Tyrophagus longior mite bites.

See also 
 Coolie itch
 Skin lesion

References 

Parasitic infestations, stings, and bites of the skin